Glebe is a rural locality in the Shire of Banana, Queensland, Australia. In the  Glebe had a population of 24 people.

Geography 
The locality is bounded to the north-west by the Dawson River. The Glebe Weir impounds the river to the south-west.

The predominant land use is grazing on native vegetation. There is a small amount of crop growing in the north-west of the locality near the Dawson River with irrigated crops near the weir.

History 
In the  Glebe had a population of 24 people.

Heritage listings 
Glebe has a number of heritage-listed sites, including:
 Taroom-Cracow Road: The Glebe Homestead

References

External links 

 
Shire of Banana
Localities in Queensland